Falckenberg is a German surname. Notable people with the surname include:

Gina Falckenberg (1907–1996), German actress
Otto Falckenberg (1873–1947), German theatre director, manager, and writer

See also
Falkenberg (surname)

German-language surnames